Balta is a surname. Notable people with the surname include:

 Hakan Balta (born 1983), Turkish midfielder footballer who plays for Galatasaray S.K.
 José Balta (1814–1872), Peruvian soldier and president of Peru, 1868–1872
 Ksenija Balta (born 1986), Estonian athlete
 María Balta, Peruvian politician
 Paul Balta (1929–2019), French journalist and writer
 Víctor Balta (born 1986), Peruvian football defender who plays for Juan Aurich